The Spanish Motocross Championship is the premier domestic Spanish Motocross series, sanctioned by the Real Federación Motociclista Española.

The series runs annually throughout late winter and spring each year. The premier classes are the Elite-MX1 and Elite-MX2 but there are also classes for younger riders, masters and women.

History 
The Spanish Motocross Championship has existed since 1959. Several riders have had periods of dominance in the history of the championship, with Toni Elías holding the highest number of titles at ten. The classes within the championship have evolved over time in line with what has been seen in the sport around the world.

Event Format 
Rounds of the Spanish Motocross Championship typically have a two day format. The Elite categories hold their qualifying on the first day, with the main races taking place on the second day. In addition to timed practice sessions, Elite categories compete in a qualifying race (in a similar vain to what happens in the FIM Motocross World Championship) to earn their starting order for the main races. From 2023 onwards, the top-five finishers of the qualifying race will receive points. These points will go towards their championship total, but will not go towards their total for each round.  

Points are awarded to the top-five finishers of the qualifying race, in the following format:
 

Points are awarded to finishers of the main races, in the following format:

Broadcast 
The comprehensive broadcast of each round of the Spanish Motocross Championship is currently via a live stream on the RFME's official YouTube channel.

List of Champions

References

External links
 

Motorcycle off-road racing series
National championships in Spain
Motorcycle racing in Spain
Motocross